Tolpia knudlarseni is a moth of the family Erebidae first described by Michael Fibiger in 2007. It is known from northern Sumatra.

The wingspan is 14–16 mm. The hindwing is brown and the underside unicolorous brown.

References

Micronoctuini
Taxa named by Michael Fibiger
Moths described in 2007